This is an alphabetical list of notable male Indian television actors.

List of Hindi actors

List of regional language actors
 Bengali

 Tamil

Telugu

 Kannada

 Marathi

 Malayalam

See also
 List of Indian television actresses
List of Indian film actors

References

and
television
Indian television